The Punch House is a public house and hotel located at Agincourt Square, Monmouth, Wales.

History
The Punch House was originally a coaching inn called The Wine Vaults.  Records show the pub was in existence in 1769. The pub was known as The Punch House from around 1832 but did not change to The Punch House officially until 1896. In 1822 the licensee was John Powell. While in the possession of the Powell family, the business also traded as a wines and spirits merchant. The pub that stands today was originally two pubs until the late 1990s. At that date the Punch House was extended to include The Bull public house which occupied the adjoining premises.  The Bull itself was originally known as The Black Bull in the 1800s. The internal door which now unites the two lounges downstairs is said to be the door of Monmouth County Gaol.

The building has been a Grade II listed building since 15 August 1974. It has a stucco frontage with chamfered quoins and a half hipped Welsh slate roof. The elevation is continuous with that of the Bull Inn which has a slightly lower roofline.

The Punch House is one of the pubs in Agincourt Square who started using QRpedia codes as part of the MonmouthpediA project in March 2012. Currently the Punch House is one of the 250 pubs that are owned by Brains Brewery.
 The Punch House was acquired by Valiant Pub Company in December 2021, Valiant sympathetically restored the pub, restaurant and rooms to their former glory through a major investment in May 2022

Gallery

Notes

Coaching inns
Monmouthshire
Grade II listed hotels
Grade II listed pubs in Wales
Hotels in Monmouth
Pubs in Monmouth